Set up by the NZ Transport Agency, Road user charges are a tax paid by users of vehicles which use a fuel which is not taxed at source.

Types of fuel which are taxed at source
Vehicles powered by petrol, compressed natural gas (CNG), and liquefied petroleum gas (LPG) do not need to pay RUC as these fuels are taxed at source. Most cars and small vehicles will fall into this category. Other vehicles such as light diesel vehicles or trucks pay through Road User Charges (RUC). Most large vehicles will fall into this category.

Vehicles subject to the tax
All vehicles that fit the criteria below are required to pay RUC:
 Vehicles that have a manufacturer's gross laden weight of 3,500 kg (7,716 lb) or more
 Vehicles that use diesel or other fuel not taxed at source

Payment
Charges are payable to the NZ Transport agency enforced by NZ police so all road users must ensure you have the correct documents displayed at all times in order to avoid a fine.
There are several exemptions available for certain types of vehicles such as tractors however they vast majority of larger vehicles will be required to pay RUC.

Details on payment can be found on the New Zealand Transport Agency Website. http://www.nzta.govt.nz/vehicle/registration-licensing/ruc/overview.html

References

External links
Motor Vehicle Tax

Vehicle taxes